Richard Stephenson (born 5 December 1966), better known as Richie Stephens is a Jamaican R&B, dancehall and reggae singer and producer.

Biography
Born in Savanna-la-Mar, Westmoreland, Jamaica, Stephens worked in the early 1990s as part of the twice Grammy Award winning act Soul II Soul. He recorded at Motown, and recorded for the VP label before establishing his own label, Pot of Gold Records. Later that decade he released dancehall singles such as "Winner", "Bus the Place" and "Slop Dem". His tracks "Legacy" (Mad Cobra featuring Richie Stephens, 1993) and "Come Give Me Your Love" (Richie Stephens featuring General Degree, 1997) peaked at numbers 64 and 61 respectively in the UK Singles Chart.

In 1998, Stephens' album Winner was released by Greensleeves, produced by himself, Frenchie, Danny Brownie and Donovan Germain. Since then, Stephens has focused his music on Christian related themes.

In 2006 Stephens received the Jamaican Governor-General's Achievement Award for contributing to civic, social and recreational projects in and around the parish of Westmoreland.

In January 2011 Richie's adopted son Demar Graham, who went by the stage name Copper Cat, was shot and killed outside his home in Kingston.

He released a new album God is on My Side on 22 May 2012, under Pot of Gold/VPAL. He also released a collaboration album with German reggae singer Gentleman on 27 November 2012. In 2014, following the growth of EDM in Jamaica, Stephens sought to capitalize on this by launching a new riddim called 'Skatech' which was an amalgamation of Jamaican ska and EDM. Stephens believed that due to ska not being at the forefront of Jamaican music for many years, combining it with something fresh could bring it back into the spotlight.

On 16 March 2013 he sang the Jamaican national anthem at the WCQ between Jamaica and Panama at the National Stadium, Kingston.

In 2015 he began working with Italian ska ensemble the Ska Nation Band, while continuing to work as a solo artist. In November 2015 he was reportedly working on a new solo album set for release in early 2016.

Album discography
On Broadway (1990), Jamaazima
Richie Stpehens (1991), Gong Sounds
Sincerely (1991), VP
Pot of Gold (1993), Motown
Forever (1994), Pot of Gold
Miracles (1995), VP
Special Work of Art (1996), Penthouse
Buff Baff (1997), Multimedia
Winner (1998), Greensleeves
Perfect Love (2000), VP
The Man Upstairs (2002), Ejaness
Covers for Lovers (2003), Pot of Gold
Come to Jamaica (2008), Pot of Gold
Reggae Evolution (2010), Pot of Gold
Live Your Life (2012), Pot of Gold – with Gentleman
God Is on My Side (2012), Pot of Gold
Real Reggae Music (2013), Kingstone
Internationally (2016), Richie Stephens and the Ska Nation Band, Pot of Gold, Adriatic Sound

Accusation of rape
In 2021 Richie Stephens was accused of rape by numerous women. First who spoke up was Elaine Lim 27 year-old from Singapore. She said she stayed in one flat with Stephens while he was touring in Australia in 2019 and was raped by him.
Stephens denied all the allegations. In October 2021 another 7 women have come forward with the same stories as Lim told the press

References

External links

 
 Richie Stephens Youtube Channel

1966 births
Living people
Jamaican singer-songwriters
Jamaican record producers
Jamaican reggae musicians
Motown artists
Reggae fusion artists
People from Westmoreland Parish
VP Records artists
Greensleeves Records artists